Pañcarakṣā means "Five Protectors", and it is the title of a Buddhist text in Sanskrit. It is an early work in the dhāraṇī genre of Buddhist literature, with Tibetan records mentioning it by about 800 CE. The Pañcarakṣā manuscripts survive in Tibet, Nepal and India in many divergent versions. The text includes spells, a list of benefits by its recitation, and the ritual instructions on how and when to use it. In the Buddhist tradition, each of the "Five" protections that are mentioned in the Pañcarakṣā are Buddhist deities (goddesses).

References

Buddhist texts
Sanskrit texts